Reefat Bin-Sattar (born  25 July 1974) is a Bangladeshi chess grandmaster.

Career
Bin-Sattar earned the International Master title in 1993 and Grandmaster title in 2005. All three of his GM qualifying norms were obtained at tournaments held in Dhaka.

Bin-Sattar has represented Bangladesh in seven Chess Olympiads from 1994 to 2006.

References

External links
 
 
 

1974 births
Living people
Bangladeshi chess players
Chess grandmasters
Chess Olympiad competitors
Chess players at the 2006 Asian Games
Recipients of the Bangladesh National Sports Award
Asian Games competitors for Bangladesh
Notre Dame College, Dhaka alumni
University of Dhaka alumni